The Italy national futsal team represents Italy in international futsal competitions such as the FIFA Futsal World Cup and the European Championships and is controlled by the Italian Football Federation. It is one of the strongest teams in Europe, champions in the 2003 UEFA Futsal Championship and UEFA Futsal Euro 2014. Italy has also come in second place at the 2004 FIFA Futsal World Cup, as well as third place in the 2008 and 2012 editions.

Honours

World achievements
 The Italy national futsal team has appeared in the final match of the FIFA Futsal World Cup once (2004) as well as two third/fourth place playoffs.

European achievements
 The Italy national futsal team has won the UEFA Futsal Championship twice (2003, 2014), came in as runners-up once (2007), and appeared in four third/fourth place playoffs

Tournament records

FIFA Futsal World Cup

UEFA European Futsal Championship

Grand Prix de Futsal

Futsal Confederations Cup

Futsal Mundialito

Players

Current squad
The following players were named for UEFA Futsal Euro 2014.

Results and fixtures

2014

See also
Italy national football team

References

  
European national futsal teams
National